The Russo-Swedish War of 1590–1595 was instigated by Boris Godunov in the hope of gaining the territory of the Duchy of Estonia along the Gulf of Finland belonging to Sweden since the previous Livonian War.

As soon as the Truce of Plussa expired early in 1590, a large Russian army led by Godunov and his sickly brother-in-law, Fyodor I of Russia, marched from Moscow towards Novgorod. On 18 January they crossed the Narva River and laid siege to the Swedish castle of Narva, commanded by Arvid Stålarm. Another important fortress,  Jama (Jamburg), fell to Russian forces within two weeks. Simultaneously, the Russians ravaged Estonia as far as Reval (Tallinn) and Finland as far as Helsingfors (Helsinki).

On 25 February, the local Swedish governor, Carl Henriksson Horn af Kanckas, was compelled to sign an armistice, which obliged Sweden to surrender the territories won by the Treaty of Plussa — namely Jama, Koporye, and Ivangorod. This peace settlement displeased John III of Sweden, who sent a fleet to take hold of Ivangorod, but this attempt to besiege the fortress was checked by a Russian castellan. Matters then remained quiet until summer 1591, when the Swedes struck against Gdov, capturing a local governor, Prince Vladimir Dolgorukov.

The other war theatre was Eastern Karelia, where the Swedes sacked Kola and other Russian settlements bordering the White Sea. A raiding party allegedly led by Finnish peasant chief Pekka Vesainen, destroyed the Pechenga Monastery on December 25, 1589, killing 50 monks and 65 lay brothers. He then turned his troops to Kola Fjord but could not manage to destroy the Kola Fortress due to lack of men. Instead he captured and burned Kandalaksha (Kantalahti) and a small Russian settlement in Kem. Again, due to lack of men, he could not capture the Solovetsky Monastery on the Solovetsky Islands.

Godunov's government gradually overcame those setbacks, as Prince Volkonsky was sent to pacify Karelia, and the noblest Russian generals Bogdan Belsky, Fyodor Mstislavsky, and Prince Trubetskoy devastated Finland. Then, the war settled into indecisive skirmishing from which it would not subsequently emerge. Three years elapsed before Sweden, in May 1595, agreed to sign the Treaty of Teusina (Tyavzino, Tyavzin, Täyssinä). It restored to Russia all territory ceded in the Truce of Plussa of 1583 to Sweden except for Narva. Russia had to renounce all claims on Estonia, including Narva, and Sweden's sovereignty over Estonia from 1561 was confirmed.

1590s conflicts
Wars involving Russia
Wars involving Sweden
16th century in Estonia
History of Karelia
1590s in Russia
1590s in Sweden
Russia–Sweden military relations
16th-century military history of Russia